O. Arthur Kirkman House and Outbuildings is a historic urban estate located at High Point, Guilford County, North Carolina. Its main house, built in 1913, is a two-story brick dwelling with design elements from the Colonial Revival, Tudor Revival, and Bungalow / American Craftsman. It has a steep pitched gable roof, wide eaves with decorative brackets, and stained glass windows.  In addition, the property displays a contributing detached, single car garage (1913), a brick dog house (1913), a depot (1916-1917), an office (pre-1913), and the former Blair School (c. 1911).

It was listed on the National Register of Historic Places in 1988.

References

Buildings and structures in High Point, North Carolina
Houses on the National Register of Historic Places in North Carolina
Colonial Revival architecture in North Carolina
Tudor Revival architecture in North Carolina
Houses completed in 1913
Houses in Guilford County, North Carolina
National Register of Historic Places in Guilford County, North Carolina
1913 establishments in North Carolina